Christina Yngvesdotter Herrström Schildt (born Herrström 23 August 1959 in Lidingö, Sweden) is a Swedish author and screenwriter. She has been married to Peter Schildt. She has written among the children's books Ebba & Didrik, Glappet and Tusen gånger starkare and she has also written the films/TV series based on these books (Glappet was first a TV series but she wrote a book based on it). She has also written other films and TV series.

References

External links
Christina Herrström on Bonnier Carlsen's website
Christina Herrström on DramaDirekt's website
Swedish Film Database
Internet Movie Database

1959 births
Living people
People from Lidingö Municipality
Swedish screenwriters
Swedish children's writers
Swedish women children's writers
Swedish-language writers
Swedish women screenwriters